The Belarusian Ridge is a line of terminal moraines in the northwest of Belarus. The feature is part of the East European Plain.

This ridge, consisting of low, rolling hills, runs for about 500 km in the direction from west-southwest to east-northeast, from the area of the Brest region, which is close to the border of Poland to the Russian town of Smolensk.

The geological constitution of the ridge is mostly moraine loams with added glacial and alluvial sediments.

The ridge itself is divided in sections called "uplands." These uplands are created by various river valleys that cut through the entire ridge. The ten uplands are (in sequence of west to east):

Hrodna upland
Vaukavysk upland
Shchara valley
Navahradak upland
Neman River valley
Minsk upland
Berezina valley
Daugava and Vitsebsk-Nevel uplands
Dnieper upland
Orsha upland
a final group of uplands along the eastern boundary with Russia

The highest elevation of the ridge (and the whole Belarus) is Mount Dzyarzhynskaya, 365m.

References

External links 
 http://www.belarusguide.com/nature1/natgeo.html

Landforms of Belarus
Ridges of Europe
Moraines of Europe